The Albrun Pass (German: Albrunpass, Italian: Passo d'Arbola or Bocchetta d'Arbola) is an Alpine pass connecting Switzerland and Italy. It connects Binn in the Binntal on its northern side to Baceno on its southern side. The Albrun Pass is the lowest pass on the main chain of the Alps between the Simplon Pass and the Gotthard Pass.

The pass is located between the Albrunhorn (west) and the Ofenhorn (east).

References

External links
Albrun Pass on Hikr

Mountain passes of Switzerland
Mountain passes of Italy
Mountain passes of the Alps
Lepontine Alps
Italy–Switzerland border crossings